The 1980 Polish Speedway season was the 1980 season of motorcycle speedway in Poland.

Individual

Polish Individual Speedway Championship
The 1980 Individual Speedway Polish Championship final was held on 22 July at Leszno.

Golden Helmet
The 1980 Golden Golden Helmet organised by the Polish Motor Union (PZM) was the 1980 event for the league's leading riders. It was held over 4 rounds.

Final standings (top ten)

Junior Championship
 winner - Mirosław Berliński

Silver Helmet
 winner - Maciej Jaworek

Bronze Helmet
 winner - Marek Kępa

Pairs

Polish Pairs Speedway Championship
The 1980 Polish Pairs Speedway Championship was the 1980 edition of the Polish Pairs Speedway Championship. The final was held on 31 July at Zielona Góra.

Team

Team Speedway Polish Championship
The 1980 Team Speedway Polish Championship was the 1980 edition of the Team Polish Championship. 

Unia Leszno won the gold medal for the second consecutive season. The team included Mariusz Okoniewski, Roman Jankowski and Bernard Jąder.

First League

Second League

References

Poland Individual
Poland Team
Speedway
1980 in Polish speedway